A foreign agent is any person or entity actively carrying out the interests of a foreign country while located in another host country, generally outside the protections offered to those working in their official capacity for a diplomatic mission.

Foreign agents may be citizens of the host country. In contemporary English, the term has a generally pejorative connotation. A covert foreign agent, also known as a secret agent of a foreign government, may in some countries be presumed to be engaging in espionage.

Legality 
Some countries have formal procedures to legalize the activities of foreign agents acting overtly. Laws covering foreign agents vary widely from country to country, and selective enforcement may prevail within countries, based on perceived national interest.

United States 
In the United States, the Foreign Agents Registration Act (FARA) created a wide-ranging and detailed definition of "foreign agent". The FARA was enacted in 1938 to counter Nazi propaganda. The law is sometimes claimed to be used to target countries out of favor with an administration. In 2021, the American Bar Association (ABA) called for a reform of FARA, including "renam[ing] FARA and otherwise replacing] the term 'agent of a foreign principal' with a term that elicits less stigma and causes less confusion".

Russia 
Under the 2012 Russian foreign agent law, non-governmental organizations have to designate themselves "foreign agents" in all external communication if they engage in "political activity", a broadly interpreted term, and receive any foreign funding. Failure to comply is subject to legal consequences. Still, many human rights organizations resisted the requirement and in 2014 the law was amended  to authorize the Justice Ministry to register organizations as foreign agents without their consent.

Georgia 
In 2023, People's Power and Georgian Dream submitted a draft of new foreign agent law to the Parliament of Georgia. This caused the 2023 Georgian protests. The bill proposed that all non-governmental organizations and independent media should declare themselves as foreign agents if they receive more than 20% of their funding from abroad. The proponents said a law was needed for transparency, and compared it to the U.S. FARA legislation. The critics said the Russian-style law would push Georgia towards authoritarianism. The president of Georgia, Salome Zurabishvili, supported the protesters and said she would veto the bill. The parliament withdrew the bill after protests.

See also 
 Foreign funding of NGOs
 Anti-Infiltration Act

References

International relations
Foreign intervention